Osvětimany is a market town in Uherské Hradiště District in the Zlín Region of the Czech Republic. It has about 900 inhabitants.

Notable people
Oldřich Pechal (1913–1942), soldier and resistance fighter

References

Populated places in Uherské Hradiště District
Market towns in the Czech Republic